Hiltner is a surname. Notable people with the surname include:

Michael Hiltner (born 1941), American author, poet, designer, and cyclist
Mike Hiltner (born 1966), American ice hockey player
W. Albert Hiltner (1914–1991), American astronomer
4924 Hiltner, a main-belt asteroid